Thomas McNulty may refer to:

 Thomas McNulty (footballer) (1929–1979), English football player
 Thomas F. McNulty (1906–?), American radio broadcasting executive
 Thomas Francis McNulty (1858–1932), American Democratic Party political operative and epithetist
 Thomas Nulty (1818–1898), or McNulty, Irish Roman Catholic bishop